Leoncio Carreon Jr. is a Filipino international lawn bowler.

Bowls career
Carreon was selected as part of the five man team by the Philippines for the 2020 World Outdoor Bowls Championship, which was due to be held in the Gold Coast, Australia.

He won a fours bronze medal (with Christopher Dagpin, Angelo Morales and Ronald Lising) at the 2009 Asia Pacific Bowls Championships, held in Kuala Lumpur and a gold medal in the fours at the Lawn bowls at the 2017 Southeast Asian Games.

In 2023, he won the pairs gold medal (with Ronald Lising) at the 14th Asian Lawn Bowls Championship in Kuala Lumpur.

References

Living people
Filipino male lawn bowls players
Year of birth missing (living people)
Southeast Asian Games medalists in lawn bowls
Competitors at the 2005 Southeast Asian Games
Competitors at the 2017 Southeast Asian Games
Southeast Asian Games gold medalists for the Philippines
Southeast Asian Games competitors for the Philippines
Southeast Asian Games silver medalists for the Philippines